Maybeck Recital Hall, also known as Maybeck Studio for Performing Arts, is located inside the Kennedy-Nixon House located at 1537 Euclid Avenue in Berkeley, California, United States. It was built in 1914 by Bernard Maybeck. The hall seats up to 50 people and was designed upon commission for the Nixon family, local arts patrons who wanted a live-in studio for their daughter Milda's piano teacher, Mrs. Alma Kennedy. The room is paneled in unfinished clear-heart redwood, which contributes to an unusually rich and warm, yet bright and clear acoustic quality. There are two grand pianos in the space: a Yamaha S-400, and a Yamaha C7.  Maybeck originally designed the space to accommodate an 1898 7-foot Bechstein.

History
In 1923, the hall was destroyed in a hillside fire. It was rebuilt quickly by Maybeck.

Milda Nixon lived at the residence until her death in 1981 at the age of 92. Her adopted son, Charles R. Fulweiler, then held the house for several years. In 1987, the house was purchased by jazz pianist Dick Whittington, who opened the hall for public recitals.

Between 1989 and 1995, Concord Records produced 42 solo piano recitals in Maybeck Recital Hall. Each recital featured a different jazz pianist; the series eventually consisted of 42 CD. Concord also recorded 10 jazz duets at Maybeck during the same time period, which the label also released as a series of CDs.

In 1996, the house was purchased by Gregory Moore. The recital hall was no longer open for public concerts, although it was used for private concerts which were attended by invitation only. Since 2013, the newly named Maybeck Studio for the Performing Arts has continued the tradition of public concerts on Sundays at 3pm during their September–June season. The intimate hall seats 40 audience members.

Albums

Live at Maybeck series

Concord Duo series
Roger Kellaway & Red Mitchell
Dave McKenna & Gray Sargent
Ken Peplowski & Howard Alden
Alan Broadbent & Gary Foster
Adam Makowicz & George Mraz
Ralph Sutton & Dick Hyman
Bill Mays & Ed Bickert
Denny Zeitlin & David Friesen
Michael Moore & Bill Charlap	
Chris Potter & Kenny Werner: Concord Duo Series Volume Ten

External links
 Homepage 
 The Maybeck Recital Hall Piano Series: An Oral History 

Concert halls in California
Buildings and structures in Berkeley, California
Music venues in the San Francisco Bay Area
Culture of Berkeley, California
Bernard Maybeck buildings
Event venues established in 1914
1914 establishments in California